Frontenac  may refer to:

People
Louis de Buade de Frontenac, Governor of New France

Places

Canada
Quebec
Château Frontenac, hotel in Quebec City
Frontenac, Quebec
Frontenac County, Quebec
Frontenac (Montreal Metro), Montreal Metro station
Frontenac National Park (Parc national de Frontenac)
Frontenac (provincial electoral district), Quebec provincial electoral district
Frontenac (Quebec electoral district), former federal electoral district
Frontenac (1912–1973 provincial electoral district), former Quebec provincial electoral district
Frontenac Lake (Milieu River), Lac-Ashuapmushuan, RCM Le Domaine-du-Roy, Saguenay-Lac-Saint-Jean

Ontario
Fort Frontenac, French fort and trading post located in what is now Kingston, Ontario
Frontenac County:
 Township of Central Frontenac 
 Township of Frontenac Islands
 Township of North Frontenac 
 Township of South Frontenac
Frontenac Provincial Park, a provincial park near Kingston, Ontario
Frontenac Public School, Burlington, Ontario
Frontenac Secondary School, Kingston, Ontario
Frontenac (Ontario electoral district), former federal electoral district
Frontenac (Ontario provincial electoral district), former provincial electoral district

France
Frontenac, Gironde
Frontenac, Lot

United States
Frontenac, Kansas
Frontenac, Minnesota
Frontenac State Park
Frontenac, Missouri
Frontenac, Florida

Automotive
Abendroth & Root Manufacturing Co, produced automobiles under the name Frontenac 1906-1913
Frontenac Motor Corporation, a joint racing-car venture of Louis and Gaston Chevrolet 1916-1921
Dominion Motors Frontenac, a division of Durant Motors that built and sold automobiles in Canada 1931-1933
Frontenac (marque), an automobile introduced in 1960 by Ford Motor Company of Canada

Others
Frontenac (grape)
Frontenac Axis, a geological feature in Canada and the United States
 Lac Frontenac or Lac de Frontenac, an old name for Lake Ontario
PS Frontenac, first paddle steamer launched on the Great Lakes
McColl-Frontanac Oil Company, a Canadian company acquired by Texaco in 1956
Frontenac: or The Atotarho of the Iroquois, a poem by Alfred Billings Street